Rasim Inalyevich Khutov (9 July 1981) is a Russian retired professional footballer who played as a forward or midfielder.

Club career
Khutov played five seasons in the Russian Football National League for Dynamo Stavropol, FC Lada Togliatti and Dynamo Makhachkala.

Honours
 Russian Second Division Zone South best player: 2004

References

1981 births
Living people
Russian footballers
Association football forwards
FC Dynamo Stavropol players
FC Lada-Tolyatti players
FC Chernomorets Novorossiysk players
PFC Spartak Nalchik players
FC Dynamo Makhachkala players